Ogan Komering Ilir Regency (abbreviation OKI) is a regency of South Sumatra Province, Indonesia. It takes its name from the Ogan River and the Komering River, which are the two main rivers that drain the area. The name Ilir means downstream (there are other regencies in the province named Ogan Komering Ulu, South Ogan Komering Ulu and East Ogan Komering Ulu; Ulu means upstream). The administrative centre is the town of Kayu Agung. The regency borders Palembang, Ogan Ilir Regency and Banyuasin Regency to the north, Bangka Strait, and Java Sea to the east, Lampung Province to the south, and Ogan Ilir Regency, and East Ogan Komering Ulu Regency to the west.

It has an area of 19,023.47 km2 and a population of 727,376 at the 2010 Census and 769,348 at the 2020 Census. Major crops include coffee, sugar cane, oil palm, rubber, cocoa bean, pineapple, tea and fish.

Administrative districts 

This Regency is administratively composed of eighteen districts (kecamatan), listed below with their areas (in km2) and their populations at the 2010 and 2020 Censuses. The table also includes the locations of the distriuct administrative centres, the number of villages in each district (there are 327 villages in all comprising 13 urban kelurahan and 314 rural desa) and its postal code.

History 
In the Dutch colonial period, the region was included in the territory of South Sumatra and Sub Residency (Afdeeling) Palembang and Tanah Datar with its capital of Palembang. The afdeeling was divided into several onder afdeeling, and Ogan Komering Ilir region covers the former areas of onder afdeeling Komering Ilir and onder afdeeling Ogan Ilir.

After the Republic of Indonesia's independence, the territory of Ogan Komering Ilir was included in the residency of Palembang, which included 26 marga. Then, based on the Emergency Act No.4/1956 on the Establishment of the Autonomous Region Regencies in South Sumatra Province, Ogan Komering Ilir became one of the regencies in the province of South Sumatra. After the dissolution of the marga, Ogan Komering Ilir regency was divided into 12 districts and 4 "districts with definitive representation".

By 1996 Ogan Komering Ilir Regency had 14 districts and 4 "districts with definitive representation". Fourth districts such representation is the Pematang Panggang District (now Sungai Menang District) with the District Parent Mesuji, District Cengal with the District Parent Tulung Selapan, District Rantau Alai with the District Parent Tanjung Raja and District Jejawi with the District Parent Sirah Pulau Padang. Furthermore, in 2001 the government reformed the four "districts with definitive representation" into full districts, so Ogan Komering Ilir thus has 18 districts.

Based on Presidential Decree No.37/2003 on the Establishment of East Ogan Komering Ulu, Ogan Komering Ilir and Ogan Ilir in South Sumatra Province, Ogan Komering Ilir Regency was divided into two regencies, namely Ogan Komering Ilir Regency and Ogan Ilir Regency. Ogan Ilir Regency included the 6 districts of Inderalaya (as the capital), Tanjung Raja, Tanjung Batu, Muara Kuang, Pemulutan and Rantau Alai. After this expansion, Ogan Komering Ilir regency consisted of 12 districts.

Then, in accordance with Regencies Act No.5/2005, five of the existing Ogan Komering Ilir regencies were divided to form six new districts, namely Lempuing Jaya (from part of Lempuing), Mesuji Makmur and Masuji Raya (from part of Mesuji), East Pedamaran (from part of Pedamaran), Teluk Gelam (from part of Tanjung Lubuk), and Pangkalan Lampam (from part of Pampangan). After this expansion Ogan Komering Ilir Regency has 18 administrative districts.

References

Regencies of South Sumatra